Ground Zero is a blues club in Clarksdale, Mississippi that is co-owned by Morgan Freeman,  Memphis entertainment executive Howard Stovall, and Eric Meier. Attorney Bill Luckett was also co-owner until his death in 2021. It got its name from the fact that Clarksdale has been historically referred to as "Ground Zero" for the blues. It opened in May 2001 and is located near the Delta Blues Museum. In the style of juke joints, it is in a repurposed, un-remodeled building, vacant for 30 years, that had housed the wholesale Delta Grocery and Cotton Co. There is no proper decor to speak of. Mismatched chairs, Christmas-tree lights, and graffiti greet one everywhere. Blues fans in Clarksdale welcomed it as a place where local musicians have a chance to work regularly.

The menu consists of traditional Southern foods, and the restaurant has live blues music playing Wednesday through Saturday.  Super Chikan and Bill "Howl-n-Madd" Perry, not to be confused with the deceased Bill Perry, are two of the most frequent and well-known performers.  In addition to the food and music, there are seven upstairs apartments that can be rented out to customers who would like to live the blues experience 24 hours a day.

Ground Zero has appeared in many television shows and publications, including:
60 Minutes
Stephen Fry in America (BBC Documentary), 3rd episode, aired 26 October 2008.
The Mighty Mississippi
"The Story of God W/Morgan Freeman, S1/E3(Who is God)" ([NatGeo])

Video
 
 Live at Ground Zero Blues Club: Bobby Rush

See also

References

External links 
 Ground Zero Blues Club home page
 Gary Vincent Productions

Music of Mississippi
Restaurants in Mississippi
Music venues in Mississippi
Restaurants established in 2001
Music venues completed in 2001
2001 establishments in Mississippi
Blues venues
Buildings and structures in Coahoma County, Mississippi
Clarksdale, Mississippi